Ashkelon or Ashqelon (Hebrew: , , ;), also known as Ascalon (Ancient Greek: , ; Arabic:), is a coastal city in the Southern District of Israel on the Mediterranean coast,  south of Tel Aviv, and  north of the border with the Gaza Strip. 

The modern city is named after the ancient seaport of Ashkelon, which was destroyed in 1270 and whose remains can now be seen at the archaeological site known as Tel Ashkelon on the southeastern edge of the modern metropolis. These ruins date back to the Neolithic Age, and saw the passage of numerous civilizations, including the Ancient Egyptians, Canaanites, Philistines, Assyrians, Babylonians, Greeks, Hasmoneans, Romans, Persians, the Arabs and Crusaders. The Palestinian village of Al-Jura was formerly immediately adjacent to the ruins.

The modern urban development of the area began approximately 4 km inland from the ancient site as the Palestinian town of  al-Majdal (Arabic:  al-Mijdal; Hebrew:  ʾĒl-Mīǧdal). Its inhabitants were exclusively Muslims and Christians; on the eve of the 1948 Arab–Israeli War the inhabitants numbered 10,000 and in October 1948, the city accommodated thousands more Palestinian refugees from nearby villages. The town was conquered by Israeli forces on 5 November 1948, by which time much of the Arab population had fled, leaving some 2,700 inhabitants, of which 500 were deported by Israeli soldiers in December 1948 and most of the rest were deported by 1950. Today, the city's population is almost entirely Jewish. 

Migdal was initially repopulated by Jewish immigrants and demobilized soldiers. It was subsequently renamed multiple times, first as Migdal Gaza, Migdal Gad and Migdal Ashkelon, until in 1953 the coastal neighborhood of Afridar was incorporated and the name "Ashkelon" was adopted for the combined town. By 1961, Ashkelon was ranked 18th among Israeli urban centers with a population of 24,000.

Etymology
The name Ashkelon is probably western Semitic, and might be connected to the triliteral root  ("to weigh" from a Semitic root , akin to Hebrew   or Arabic   "weight") perhaps attesting to its importance as a center for mercantile activities. Scallion and shallot are derived from Ascalonia, the Latin name for Ashkelon.

History

Early history

Tel Ashkelon

The archaeological site of Ashkelon, today known as Tel Ashkelon, was the oldest and largest seaport in Canaan, part of the pentapolis (a grouping of five cities) of the Philistines, north of Gaza and south of Jaffa.

The site was an important city during the Roman, Byzantine and early Islamic periods, and particularly during the period of the Crusades, due to its location near the coast and between the Crusader States and Egypt. The Battle of Ascalon was the last action of the First Crusade. In 1270, the Mamluk sultan Baybars ordered the citadel and harbour at the site to be destroyed. As a result of this destruction, the city was abandoned by its inhabitants and fell into disuse.

El-Jurah

The Palestinian village of Al-Jura (El-Jurah) stood northeast of and immediately adjacent to Tel Ashkelon and is documented in Ottoman tax registers.

Majdal
The Arab village of Majdal was mentioned by historians and tourists at the end of the 15th century. In 1596, Ottoman records showed Majdal to be a large village of 559 Muslim households, making it the 7th-most-populous locality in Palestine after Safad, Jerusalem, Gaza, Nablus, Hebron and Kafr Kanna.

An official Ottoman village list of about 1870 showed that Medschdel had a total of 420 houses and a population of 1175, though the population count included men only.

Mandatory Palestine

El-Jurah

El-Jurah was depopulated during the 1948 war.

Majdal

In the 1922 census of Palestine, Majdal had a population of 5,064; 33 Christians and 5,031 Muslims, increasing in the 1931 census to 6,166 Muslims and 41 Christians.

In the 1945 statistics Majdal had a population of 9,910; ninety Christians and 9,820 Muslims, with a total (urban and rural) of 43,680 dunams of land, according to an official land and population survey. Two thousand two hundred and fifty dunes were public land; all the rest was owned by Arabs. of the dunams, 2,337 were used for citrus and bananas, 2,886 were plantations and irrigable land, 35,442 for cereals, while 1,346 were built-up land.

Majdal was especially known for its weaving industry. The town had around 500 looms in 1909. In 1920 a British Government report estimated that there were 550 cotton looms in the town with an annual output worth 30–40 million francs.<ref>{{cite web |title=H.M. Stationery Office (1920) Syria and Palestine" — Viewer — World Digital Library |url=https://www.wdl.org/en/item/11774/view/1/1/#q=Israel |website=www.wdl.org |language=en}}</ref> But the industry suffered from imports from Europe and by 1927 only 119 weaving establishments remained. The three major fabrics produced were "malak" (silk), 'ikhdari' (bands of red and green) and 'jiljileh' (dark red bands). These were used for festival dresses throughout Southern Palestine. Many other fabrics were produced, some with poetic names such as ji'nneh u nar ("heaven and hell"), nasheq rohoh ("breath of the soul") and abu mitayn ("father of two hundred").

 Israel 

During the 1948 war, the Egyptian army occupied a large part of the Gaza region including Majdal. Over the next few months, the town was subjected to Israeli air-raids and shelling. All but about 1,000 of the town's residents were forced to leave by the time it was captured by Israeli forces as a sequel to Operation Yoav on 4 November 1948. General Yigal Allon ordered the expulsion of the remaining Palestinians but the local commanders did not do so and the Arab population soon recovered to more than 2,500 due mostly to refugees slipping back and also due to the transfer of Palestinians from nearby villages. Most of them were elderly, women, or children. During the next year or so, the Palestinians were held in a confined area surrounded by barbed wire, which became commonly known as the "ghetto". Moshe Dayan and Prime Minister David Ben-Gurion were in favor of expulsion, while Mapam and the Israeli labor union Histadrut objected. The government offered the Palestinians positive inducements to leave, including a favorable currency exchange, but also caused panic through night-time raids. The first group was deported to the Gaza Strip by truck on 17 August 1950 after an expulsion order had been served. The deportation was approved by Ben-Gurion and Dayan over the objections of Pinhas Lavon, secretary-general of the Histadrut, who envisioned the town as a productive example of equal opportunity. By October 1950, twenty Palestinian families remained, most of whom later moved to Lydda or Gaza. According to Israeli records, in total 2,333 Palestinians were transferred to the Gaza Strip, 60 to Jordan, 302 to other towns in Israel, and a small number remained in Ashkelon. Lavon argued that this operation dissipated "the last shred of trust the Arabs had in Israel, the sincerity of the State's declarations on democracy and civil equality, and the last remnant of confidence the Arab workers had in the Histadrut." Acting on an Egyptian complaint, the Egyptian-Israel Mixed Armistice Commission ruled that the Palestinians transferred from Majdal should be returned to Israel, but this was not done.

Ashkelon was formally granted to Israel in the 1949 Armistice Agreements. Re-population of the recently vacated Arab dwellings by Jews had been official policy since at least December 1948, but the process began slowly. The Israeli national plan of June 1949 designated al-Majdal as the site for a regional urban center of 20,000 people. From July 1949, new immigrants and demobilized soldiers moved to the new town, increasing the Jewish population to 2,500 within six months. These early immigrants were mostly from Yemen, North Africa, and Europe. During 1949, the town was renamed Migdal Gaza, and then Migdal Gad. Soon afterwards it became Migdal Ashkelon. The city began to expand as the population grew. In 1951, the neighborhood of Afridar was established for Jewish immigrants from South Africa, and in 1953 it was incorporated into the city. The current name Ashkelon was adopted and the town was granted local council status in 1953. In 1955, Ashkelon had more than 16,000 residents. By 1961, Ashkelon ranked 18th among Israeli urban centers with a population of 24,000. This grew to 43,000 in 1972 and 53,000 in 1983. In 2005, the population was more than 106,000.

On 1–2 March 2008, rockets fired by Hamas from the Gaza Strip (some of them Grad rockets) hit Ashkelon, wounding seven, and causing property damage. Mayor Roni Mahatzri stated that "This is a state of war, I know no other definition for it. If it lasts a week or two, we can handle that, but we have no intention of allowing this to become part of our daily routine." In March 2008, 230 buildings and 30 cars were damaged by rocket fire on Ashkelon.
On 12 May 2008, a rocket fired from the northern Gazan city of Beit Lahiya hit a shopping mall in southern Ashkelon, causing significant structural damage. According to The Jerusalem Post, four people were seriously injured and 87 were treated for shock. Fifteen people suffered minor to moderate injuries as a result of the collapsed structure. Southern District Police chief Uri Bar-Lev believed the Grad-model Katyusha rocket was manufactured in Iran.

In March 2009, a Qassam rocket hit a school, destroying classrooms and injuring two people.

In November 2014, the mayor, Itamar Shimoni, began a policy of discrimination against Arab workers, refusing to allow them to work on city projects to build bomb shelters for children. His discriminatory actions brought criticism from others, including Israeli Prime Minister Benjamin Netanyahu and Jerusalem mayor Nir Barkat who likened the discrimination to the anti-Semitism experienced by Jews in Europe 70 years earlier.

On May 11, 2021, Hamas fired 137 rockets on Ashkelon killing 2 and injuring many others.

Urban development

In 1949 and 1950, three immigrant transit camps (ma'abarot) were established alongside Majdal (renamed Migdal) for Jewish refugees from Arab countries, Romania and Poland. Northwest of Migdal and the immigrant camps, on the lands of the depopulated Palestinian village al-Jura, entrepreneur Zvi Segal, one of the signatories of Israel's Declaration of Independence, established the upscale Barnea neighborhood.

A large tract of land south of Barnea was handed over to the trusteeship of the South African Zionist Federation, which established the neighborhood of Afridar. Plans for the city were drawn up in South Africa according to the garden city model. Migdal was surrounded by a broad ring of orchards. Barnea developed slowly, but Afridar grew rapidly. The first homes, built in 1951, were inhabited by new Jewish immigrants from South Africa and South America, with some native-born Israelis. The first public housing project for residents of the transit camps, the Southern Hills Project (Hageva'ot Hadromiyot) or Zion Hill (Givat Zion), was built in 1952.

Under a plan signed in October 2015, seven new neighborhoods comprising 32,000 housing units, a new stretch of highway, and three new highway interchanges will be built, turning Ashkelon into the sixth-largest city in Israel.

Economy
Ashkelon is the northern terminus for the Trans-Israel pipeline, which brings petroleum products from Eilat to an oil terminal at the port. The Ashkelon seawater reverse osmosis (SWRO) desalination plant is the largest in the world. The project was developed as a BOT (build–operate–transfer) by a consortium of three international companies: Veolia water, IDE Technologies and Elran. In March 2006, it was voted "Desalination Plant of the Year" in the Global Water Awards.

Since 1992, Israel Beer Breweries has been operating in Ashkelon, brewing Carlsberg and Tuborg beer for the Israeli market. The brewery is owned by the Central Bottling Company, which has also held the Israeli franchise for Coca-Cola products since 1968.Arak Ashkelon, a local brand of arak, is operating since 1925 and distributed throughout Israel.

Education

The city has 19 elementary schools, and nine junior high and high schools. The Ashkelon Academic College opened in 1998, and now hosts thousands of students. Harvard University operates an archaeological summer school program in Ashkelon.

Landmarks
Ashkelon National Park
The ancient site of Ashkelon is now a national park on the city's southern coast. The walls that encircled the city are still visible, as well as Canaanite earth ramparts. The park contains Byzantine, Crusader and Roman ruins. The largest dog cemetery in the ancient world was discovered in Ashkelon.

 Bath Houses 
In 1986 ruins of 4th- to 6th-century baths were found in Ashkelon. The bath houses are believed to have been used for prostitution. The remains of nearly 100 mostly male infants were found in a sewer under the bathhouse, leading to conjectures that prostitutes had discarded their unwanted newborns there.

 Religious sites 
 Places of worship 
The remains of a 4th-century Byzantine church with marble slab flooring and glass mosaic walls can be seen in the Barnea Quarter. Remains of a synagogue from this period have also been found.

 Maqam al-Imam al-Husayn 

An 11th-century mosque, Maqam al-Imam al-Husayn, a site of pilgrimage for both Sunnis and Shiites, which had been built under the Fatimids by Badr al-Jamali and where tradition held that the head of Mohammad's grandson Hussein ibn Ali was buried, was blown up by the IDF under instructions from Moshe Dayan as part of a broader programme to destroy mosques in July 1950.Meron Rapoport,  'History Erased,' Haaretz, 5 July 2007. The area was subsequently redeveloped for a local Israeli hospital, Barzilai. After the site was re-identified on the hospital grounds, funds from Mohammed Burhanuddin, leader of a Shi'a Ismaili sect based in India, were used to construct a marble mosque, which is visited by Shi'ite pilgrims from India and Pakistan.

 Shrines 
A domed structure housing the 13th-century tomb of Sheikh Awad sits atop a hill overlooking Ashkelon's northern beaches.

A Roman burial tomb two kilometres north of Ashkelon Park was discovered in 1937. There are two burial tombs, a painted Hellenistic cave and a Roman cave. The Hellenistic cave is decorated with paintings of nymphs, water scenes, mythological figures and animals.

 Museums 

Ashkelon Khan and Museum contains archaeological finds, among them a replica of Ashkelon's Canaanite silver calf, whose discovery was reported on the front page of The New York Times.

The Outdoor Museum near the municipal cultural center displays two Roman burial coffins made of marble depicting battle and hunting scenes, and famous mythological scenes.

 Others 

The Ashkelon Marina, located between Delila and Bar Kochba beaches, offers a shipyard and repair services. Ashkeluna is a water-slide park on Ashkelon beach.

Health care

Ashkelon and environs is served by the Barzilai Medical Center, established in 1961. It was built in place of Hussein ibn Ali's 11th-century mosque, a center of Muslim pilgrimages, destroyed by the Israeli army in 1950. Situated  from Gaza, the hospital has been the target of numerous Qassam rocket attacks, sometimes as many as 140 over one weekend. The hospital plays a vital role in treating wounded soldiers and terror victims. A new rocket and missile-proof emergency room is under construction.

Demographics

In the early years, the city was primarily settled by Mizrahi Jews, who fled to Israel after being expelled from Muslim lands. Today, Mizrahi Jews still constitute the majority of the population. In the early 1950s, many South African Jews settled in Ashkelon, establishing the Afridar neighbourhood. They were followed by an influx of immigrants from the United Kingdom. During the 1990s, the city received additional arrivals of Ethiopian Jews and Russian Jews.

Culture and sports

The Ashkelon Sports Arena opened in 1999. The "Jewish Eye" is a Jewish world film festival that takes place annually in Ashkelon. The festival marked its seventh year in 2010. The Breeza Music Festival has been held yearly in and around Ashkelon's amphitheatre since 1992. Most of the musical performances are free. Israel Lacrosse operates substantial youth lacrosse programs in the city and recently hosted the Turkey men's national team in Israel's first home international in 2013.Im schwarzen Walfisch zu Askalon ("In Ashkelon's Black Whale inn") is a traditional German academic commercium song that describes a drinking binge staged in the ancient city.

Photos

Twin towns – sister cities

Ashkelon is twinned with:
 
  Côte Saint-Luc, Quebec, Canada
  Grodno, Belarus
  Xinyang, China
  Iquique, Chile
  Aix-en-Provence, France
  Vani, Georgia
  Kutaisi, Georgia
  Aviano, Italy
  Berlin-Pankow, Germany
  Sopot, Poland
  Entebbe, Uganda
  Portland, Oregon, United States
  Baltimore, Maryland, United States
  Sacramento, California, United States

Notable people
Antiochus of Ascalon (125–68 BC), Platonic philosopher
Ibn Hajar al-Asqalani (1372–1449), Islamic hadith scholar
Yael Abecassis (born 1967), actress and model
Yitzhak Cohen (born 1951), politician
Avi Dichter (born 1952), Israeli politician 
Shlomo Glickstein (born 1958), professional tennis player
Boris Polak (born 1954), world champion and Olympic sport shooter

See also
 List of cities of the ancient Near East

References
Citations

Bibliography

 
 
 
 

 
 
 . 
 
 
  
 
 
 

 
 

External links

 Ashkelon City Council
 "Ashkelon, ancient city of the sea", National Geographic'', January 2001
 Ancient Ashkelon—University of Chicago
 English information on Ashkelon—Ashkelon Volunteers
 Welcome To The City of al-Majdal Asqalan Information and images about the historical Palestinian city of Mijdal and what remains of it today, as Ashkelon's Migdal neighbourhood

 
Populated coastal places in Israel
Cities in Southern District (Israel)
Holy cities